The Brant County Council is the governing body of the County of Brant government in Brant, Ontario, Canada. Members represent wards throughout the county, and are known as councillors. The council consists of a mayor and ten councillors, two representing each of five wards. Elections are held every four years, with the two candidates with the highest popular vote winning the election.

2022 - 2026 Council

2018 - 2022 Council

2014 - 2018 Council

References

County of Brant